This is a list of Burkinabé writers.

 François Djobi Bassolet (1933–2001), journalist, historian, and cultural leader
 Angèle Bassolé-Ouédraogo (b. 1967), French-language poet, Ivorian-Canadian journalist and poet raised in Burkina Faso
 Jacques Prosper Bazié (b. 1955), poet
 Nazi Boni (1909–1969), politician and writer
 Sarah Bouyain (b. 1968), French-Burkinabé writer and film director
 Simporé Simone Compaore (b. c. 1956), French-language playwright
 Augustin-Sondé Coulibaly (b. 1933), French-language novelist, poet and critic
 Bernadette Sanou Dao (b. 1952), politician, poet and children's writer
 D. Jean Pierre Guingané (b. 1947), playwright, actor and director
 Frédéric Guirma (b. 1931), writer and politician
 Zarra Guiro (b. 1957), French-language autobiographical writer
 Ignace Ansomwin Hien (b. 1952), novelist, poet and storywriter
 Monique Ilboudo (b. 1959), politician and writer
 Pierre Claver Ilboudo (b. 1948), French-language novelist
 Sophie Heidi Kam (b. 1968), French-language poet, playwright and novelist
 Sandra Pierrette Kanzié, French-language poet
 Joseph Ki-Zerbo (1922–2006), politician, historian, writer and activist
 Amadou Koné (b. 1953), novelist, playwright and short story writer
 Gaël Koné (b. 1976), French-language poet
 Honorine Mare (b. 1972), French-language poet and academic
 Roger Nikiéma (b. c.1935), French-language journalist, novelist and poet
 Suzy Henrique Nikiéma (b. 1983), French-language novelist
 Kollin Noaga, pseudonym of Ernest Nongma Ouedraogo, politician, novelist and playwright
 Malika Ouattara (b. 1993), slam poet
 Dim-Dolobsom Ouedraogo (1897–1940), intellectual
 Titinga Frédéric Pacéré (b. 1943), griot, historian, museum curator and French-language writer
 Bernadette Sanou Dao (b. 1952), author and poet
 Adiza Sanoussi, French-language novelist
 Etienne Sawadogo, French-language novelist
 Marie-Simone Séri (b. 1954), French-language autobiographical writer also connected with Côte d'Ivoire
 Jean-Baptiste Somé, novelist
 Malidoma Patrice Somé (b. 1956), writer about religion, currently residing in Oregon, United States
 Maxime Z. Somé (b. 1959), academic, politician and novelist
 Norbert Zongo (1949–1998), assassinated newspaper publisher, editor, journalist and novelist

See also
Burkinabé literature

References

Burkinabe
Writers
Burkinabé writers